is a Japanese manga series by Tomohiro Marukawa. The series follows Kazuto Izuka, an alien girl named Narue Nanase and the trials and tribulations of the young couple as they get to know each other. The title is taken from A. E. van Vogt's The World of Null-A (Japanese title: 非Aの世界 Naru ē no Sekai).

The manga, spanning 12 volumes as of August 2011, is authored by Tomohiro Marukawa and published by Kadokawa Shoten since 2000. The manga was licensed in North America by the now-defunct CPM Manga. In 2014, the manga received the Seiun Award for Best Comic.

An anime television series adaptation ran on MBS between April 4, 2003 and June 28, 2003. Central Park Media licensed and released it in a four-disc DVD collection in 2004 under their US Manga Corps label. Following the 2009 bankruptcy and liquidation of Central Park Media, ADV Films picked up the anime series for release on July 21, 2009. Following the closure of A.D. Vision, the series is now distributed by successors Section23 Films and Æsir Holdings.

Plot
Kazuto Izuka is an average 14-year-old boy who one day encounters an abandoned puppy that turns into a space alien creature but is saved by schoolmate named Narue Nanase. When he goes to thank her, he discovers she too is a space alien whose father was part of a galactic exploration team. With the encouragement of his friend, Masaki Maruo, Izuka asks Narue out on a date. Narue is reluctant at first, but after Kazuto confesses his love to her, and assures her that he is not bothered by her alien heritage, Narue agrees and they start dating. They must deal with classmates who do not look favorably upon aliens, including Hajime Yagi, Narue's classmate and ufologist, who does not believe Narue is really an alien and thinks that she is lying to get attention. Narue's half-sister Kanaka moves to Earth along with Kanaka's caretaker Bathyscaphe who is an android spaceship. They also interact with other assorted characters, some of whom are aliens.

Characters
 
 
 Narue is a 14-year-old middle schooler who is half-alien: her father is from the Planet Nihon in the Galaxy Federation, while her mother is from Earth. She is given the offer to go into space many times but thinks of Earth as her home and does not want to leave. She has an innocent personality and is delighted when Kazuto accepts her. She wears a headband that allows her to teleport herself and Kazuto.

 

Kazuto is a 14-year-old middle schooler who falls in love with Narue. He has a kind personality and cares about people regardless of whether they are aliens or not. He is an otaku (anime geek) whose favorite show is Magical Girl #4. Although he cannot swim, he goes to the pool with Narue and their friends.

 

 Kazuto's best friend with short greyish curly hair that looks like a buzzcut. When he learns Kazuto is going to go on a date with Narue, he gives him a bunch of social tips. He and Yagi have been neighbors since childhood.

 

 Yagi is a Narue's classmate and Maruo's next-door neighbor. She has dark purple hair in braids, green eyes, and glasses. She thinks Narue is only pretending to be an alien in order to be popular, and acts hostile towards her, demanding that Narue prove she is an alien. She is regularly mocked by her classmates for her obsession with Narue as well as with aliens and UFOs in general. She befriends Kanaka, who had trouble adjusting to school, and eventually she and Narue eventually get over their misunderstandings, partly due to Kanaka, and are able to become friends.

 
 
 An alien from Planet Nihon of the Galaxy Federation who was sent to Earth to study its culture and people. Some time before his assignment to Earth 15 years ago, he had divorced his wife, with whom they raised their child Kanaka. At Earth, he worked various jobs including farming and police, but when he was recalled to return to Nihon, he refused and tried to escape, but almost drowned. He was rescued by Narumi Mutsuki, a human woman. He worked with her family, and eventually fell in love with her, and they had Narue as their daughter..

 
 
 One of Narue's female classmates with blond hair and purple eyes. She is snobby and likes to bully Narue.

 
 
 Kyoko's friend with the short brown hair.

 

 Kyoko's friend with short green hair.

 
 
 Head Inspector of the Galaxy Federation. He tries many times to persuade Narue to leave Earth and go to space, but seems to have a soft spot for Narue's family and friends. Tail Messa helped Narue's father emigrate from Planet Nihon when it became obvious convincing him otherwise was impossible, and as Head Inspector he helped arrange for the Turugistani refugee ship Ninurta to settle on Planet Nihon, thus solving a sticky diplomatic - and romantic - situation that threatened to break up Narue and Kazuto.

 

 Kanaka is the older half-sister of Narue and a full-blooded alien. She has brown hair and purple eyes. She is younger (12 years old) than Narue when she shows up due to complications of the Urashima effect (time dilation). Kanaka is surprised and confused at what has happened while she was away and acts rashly at first, causing trouble. She soon adjusts to her family on Earth, though Kanaka still has a bratty, mischievous personality. Her parents divorced before her father went on the trip to Earth.

 
 
 Named after the ship of the same name, Bathyscaphe is Kanaka's caretaker. She has grey hair styled in a bun, yellow eyes, and typically wears a purple dress with high back collar. She identifies herself as an android; her true form is a retired Escort Destroyer class starship.

 
 
 Rin is the Intelligence Mecha android who works for the Head Inspector. She appears as Kazuto's little sister with blonde hair and a ponytail. She has the ability to send mind control pulses to manipulate people's feelings. When she first appeared, she tried to seduce Kazuto away from Narue (under orders from Tail Messa), but finds out that their bond is very strong and unbreakable. In episode 9 of the anime, she uses her power to make people forget about the tsunami that was going to hit and that Haruna saved them. Android space fighter used by Tail Messa to help defend Earth. After that she warms up to them and they become friends. Rin appears to draw mainly Earth-based duties.

 
 
 Rei is a Strategic Mecha android who works for the Head Inspector. She has grey hair and wears a white dress. Android space fighter used by Tail Mesa to help defend Earth. Rei is more composed than either Rin or Ran but when surprised she can fire missiles in an instant. Rei can transform her long hair and cap into a delta wing and radome for airborne surveillance duty.

 
 
 Ran is a Tactical Mecha android who works for the Office of the Head Inspector. She has pink hair styled in twin tails and wears a pink shirt and shorts. Android space fighter used by Tail Messa to help defend Earth. More pragmatic than Rin. Ran and Rei operate from the escort carrier Binten to defend Earth from, e.g., terrorists and berserker androids. Ran can fly by transforming her ponytails into twin propulsion units.

 
 
 Narue's human mother first met Tadashi Nanase when he was trying to flee from the Galaxy Federation and almost drowned. When she shares her daily frustrations with work and life, she learns that Tadashi is willing to listen to her. Her family takes him in as a farm worker, and she falls in love with him. She is also an aggressive driver. Episode 8 of the anime is set six years after her death.

 
 
 Haruna is a Fast Escort Destroyer class starship that has gone AWOL and is hiding out in human form as a waitress at a beach restaurant. She was frightened to meet Bathyscaphe, but the latter assured her that as a retired ship she is not obligated and will not report Haruna to the alien authorities. In a later episode, Haruna moves in with the proprietor of the beach restaurant and Narue's friends give them a wedding ceremony.

 
 
 Heroine of the eponymous anime television series show that Kazuto likes.  transforms from a serious archery club member to Magical Girl #4, the Magical Girl of Love and Peace. She wears a blue and white costume with golden shoulder guards and a lance. A later episode involves Magical Girl #4's voice actor Kiriri Kaibashira, a middle schooler who liked making Narue jealous by flirting with Kazuto.

 
 
 A space ninja and terrorist from Avalon, he impersonates a puppy and attacks Kazuto in the first episode but is defeated by Narue. He then goes after Narue's father but is defeated again. He returns in the final episode.

 
 One of Narue's male classmates, very short, and very withdrawn. Nitta idolizes Narue because she is one of the few people at school who treats him kindly. His adventures include finding and wearing Narue's teleportation headband - with humorous results - and exorcising a ghost with the help of Yagi and Kudo. Nitta is constantly on library duty because he hasn't the guts to demand his classmates take their turns. (Manga only)

Episode list

Manga volumes

Note: Only the first 3 volumes were released in US bookstores and are currently out of print. The 4th and 5th volume only saw limited releases through online orders. Since the closure of CPM, the manga has not been picked up by another US publisher.

Works cited
 "Ch." is shortened form for chapter and refers to a chapter number of The World of Narue manga.
 "Ep." is shortened form for episode and refers to an episode number in The World of Narue anime.

References

External links

 The Official World of Narue Website 
 
 

1999 manga
2003 anime television series debuts
ADV Films
Central Park Media
Gonzo (company)
Kadokawa Shoten manga
Kadokawa Dwango franchises
Mainichi Broadcasting System original programming
Romantic comedy anime and manga
Science fiction anime and manga
Shōnen manga
Moe anthropomorphism
Extraterrestrials in anime and manga